Albert Watson may refer to:
 Albert Watson (academic) (1828–1904), Principal of Brasenose College, Oxford, 1886–1889
 Albert Watson (footballer, born 1903) (1903–?), English football player for Blackpool
 Albert Watson (footballer, born 1918) (1918–2009), English football player for Huddersfield and Oldham
 Albert Watson (footballer, born 1985), Northern Irish football player for Linfield and FC Edmonton
 Albert Watson (Illinois judge) (1857–1944), American jurist
 Albert Watson (photographer) (born 1942), Scottish fashion and celebrity photographer, working in the US since the early 1970s
 Albert Watson (South Carolina politician) (1922–1994), Member of the US House of Representatives from South Carolina; Republican candidate for governor of South Carolina in 1970
 Albert Watson II (1909–1993), U.S. Army officer
 Albert Durrant Watson (1859–1926), Canadian poet and physician
 Albert Leisenring Watson (1876–1960), U.S. federal judge from Pennsylvania
 Abe Watson (Albert Victor Watson, 1871–1932), Australian rules footballer